Tahir Zaman (born 6 March 1969) is a former hockey player from Pakistan who had played in the 1992 Olympics at Barcelona, Spain. Zaman, who was the team captain, later served as coach for the team and took part in the 2002 Commonwealth Games. 

Zaman also took part in the Olympic Solidarity Hockey Coaching Course as part of the International Hockey Federation's efforts to promote hockey in Asia. Tahir also played a key role in 1994 World Cup victory for Pakistan in Sydney, Australia. Tahir Zaman played in a forward position as a striker and was capped 252 times with 134 goals to his credit.

Awards
Pride of Performance Award by the President of Pakistan in 1994.

References

External links
 
official website of Pakistan Hockey Federation
Players who represented Pakistan on Pakistan Hockey Federation website

1969 births
Living people
Pakistani male field hockey players
Pakistani field hockey coaches
Field hockey players at the 1988 Summer Olympics
Field hockey players at the 1992 Summer Olympics
Field hockey players at the 1996 Summer Olympics
1998 Men's Hockey World Cup players
Olympic medalists in field hockey
Recipients of the Pride of Performance
Medalists at the 1992 Summer Olympics
Olympic bronze medalists for Pakistan
Field hockey players at the 1990 Asian Games
Field hockey players at the 1994 Asian Games
Asian Games medalists in field hockey
Asian Games gold medalists for Pakistan
Asian Games bronze medalists for Pakistan
Medalists at the 1990 Asian Games
Medalists at the 1994 Asian Games
1990 Men's Hockey World Cup players